North Vancouver station is a railway station located in the city of North Vancouver, British Columbia, Canada and is serviced by the Rocky Mountaineer tour company.  The station is used on the Rainforest to Gold Rush route that goes to Jasper (via Whistler and Quesnel). It was formerly the southern terminus of the Whistler Sea to Sky Climb.

The station is three blocks from the original North Vancouver railway station that was originally established for the Pacific Great Eastern Railway, later called BC Rail, until BC rail ended that service on October 31, 2002.

References

Rocky Mountaineer stations in British Columbia